Thelymitra alcockiae, commonly called Kath's sun orchid, is a species of orchid that is endemic to southern continental Australia. It has a single long, narrow leaf and up to twelve pale blue to deep purplish blue flowers, mauve or reddish on their back side.

Description
The lobe on the top of the anther is brown with a yellow tip, tubular and sharply curved with an inflated tip. The side lobes have dense, mop-like tufts of white hairs. Flowering occurs from August to October.

Taxonomy and naming
Thelymitra alcockiae was first formally described in 2013 by Jeff Jeanes after an unpublished description by David Jones. The formal description was published in Muelleria from a specimen collected near Naracoorte. The specific epithet (alcockiae) honours "Kath Alcock (1925-), botanical artist and field naturalist".

Distribution and habitat
Kath's sun orchid usually grows in drier habitats including shrubland, open forest and woodland. It is locally common in the north-west of Victoria and in South Australia.

References

External links
 
 

alcockiae
Endemic orchids of Australia
Orchids of Victoria (Australia)
Orchids of South Australia
Plants described in 2013